Talansky is a surname. Notable people with the surname include:

Andrew Talansky (born 1988), American professional triathlete
Morris Talansky, American businessman and Orthodox rabbi